Lawless Riders is a 1935 American Western film directed by Spencer Gordon Bennet and written by Nate Gatzert. The film stars Ken Maynard, Geneva Mitchell, Harry Woods, Frank Yaconelli, Wally Wales and Slim Whitaker. The film was released on December 6, 1935, by Columbia Pictures.

Plot

Cast          
Ken Maynard as Ken Manley
Geneva Mitchell as Edith Adams
Harry Woods as Bart
Frank Yaconelli as Pedro
Wally Wales as Carl 
Slim Whitaker as Prod
Frank Ellis as Twister
Jack Rockwell as Sheriff

References

External links
 

1935 films
1930s English-language films
American Western (genre) films
1935 Western (genre) films
Columbia Pictures films
Films directed by Spencer Gordon Bennet
American black-and-white films
1930s American films